Lady Scarface is a 1941 American crime drama film that was directed by Frank Woodruff and starred Dennis O'Keefe, Judith Anderson, and Frances Neal.

Plot 
The scar-faced gangster Slade is on the loose. Lieutenant Bill Mason travels to a hotel in New York to try and track her down. In New York Lt. Mason works together with Lt. Onslow and the crime reporter Ann Rogers to catch Slade, under the assumption that she is a man. An innocent couple at the hotel inadvertently gets involved.

Cast 
 Dennis O'Keefe as Lt. Bill Mason
 Judith Anderson as Slade
 Frances E. Neal as Ann Rogers
 Mildred Coles as Mary Jordan Powell
 Eric Blore as Mr. Hartford
 Marc Lawrence as Lefty Landers
 Damian O'Flynn as Lt. Onslow
 Andrew Tombes as Art Seidel (hotel detective)
 Marion Martin as Ruby, aka Mary Jordan
 Arthur Shields as Matt Willis
 Rand Brooks as James 'Jimmy' Powell
 Lee Bonnell as George Atkins
 Harry Burns as Big 'Sem' Semenoff

References

External links
 
 

1941 films
1941 crime drama films
American crime drama films
Films produced by Cliff Reid
American black-and-white films
RKO Pictures films
Films directed by Frank Woodruff
1940s American films
1940s English-language films